Flee (2013) is the third novel published by the American writer Evan Dara.

The novel details the strange dissolution of a fictionalized version of Burlington, Vermont, where the residents begin to flee following the closure of the local university, Pitkinson University (which largely resembles the University of Vermont).

Writing in the Times Literary Supplement, Trey Strecker notes: "In Flee, Dara returns to his most consistent theme: the complex interdependence of ecology and economy, of community and commerce.  Flee begins mid-thought: 'Something always going on -'. This 'something' is the flight from Anderburg, Vermont of the bulk of the town's residents, against a backdrop of corporate instability, civic shenanigans and rumours of a mysterious illness."

In a discussion about the book, Edwin Turner declared that "Flee is maybe the best novel (so far, anyway) to aesthetically and philosophically address the economic collapse of ’08."

References 

2013 American novels
Novels set in Burlington, Vermont
Metafictional novels
Novels by Evan Dara
Postmodern novels
American philosophical novels